Tomas Pettersson (born 15 May 1947) is a retired Swedish cyclist. He was part of the road racing team of four Pettersson brothers, known as Fåglum brothers, who won the world title in 1967–1969 and a silver medal at the 1968 Olympics. In 1967 they were awarded the Svenska Dagbladet Gold Medal.

Petterson turned professional after the 1969 World Championships, together with the other brothers. He rode the Tour de France in 1970 and 1971, and won the 1970 Trofeo Baracchi (together with brother Gösta). He retired prematurely in 1973, and later regretted that decision.

Major results

1965
 National Junior Road Championships
1st  Road race
1st  Time trial
1966
 1st  Team time trial, National Road Championships (with Gösta & Erik Pettersson)
1967
 1st  Team time trial, UCI Road World Championships (with Sture, Gösta & Erik Pettersson)
 1st  Team time trial, National Road Championships (with Sture, Gösta & Erik Pettersson)
1968
 1st  Team time trial, UCI Road World Championships (with Sture, Gösta & Erik Pettersson)
 National Road Championships
1st  Time trial
1st  Team time trial (with Sture, Gösta & Erik Pettersson)
 Summer Olympics
2nd  Team time trial (with Sture, Gösta & Erik Pettersson)
7th Road race
1969
 1st  Team time trial, UCI Road World Championships (with Sture, Gösta & Erik Pettersson)
 National Road Championships
1st  Team time trial (with Sture, Gösta & Erik Pettersson)
2nd Time trial
 1st Stage 6a Tour de l'Avenir
1970
 1st Trofeo Baracchi (with Gösta Pettersson)
 1st Stage 1a Cronostaffetta (with Pietro Guerra)
 2nd GP Industria & Commercio di Prato
 3rd Giro del Lazio
 3rd GP Lugano
 5th Giro dell'Emilia
1971
 1st Stage 5b Tour de Romandie
 2nd Coppa Placci
 2nd Trofeo Baracchi (with Gösta Pettersson)
 2nd Baden–Baden (with Gösta Pettersson)
 3rd Giro del Lazio
 4th Giro dell'Emilia
 5th Trofeo Laigueglia
 5th Gran Premio Città di Camaiore
1972
 3rd Overall Tirreno–Adriatico
1st Stage 1
 3rd Trofeo Baracchi (with Gösta Pettersson)
 3rd Giro di Puglia
 3rd Giro del Lazio
 3rd Coppa Agostoni
 4th Coppa Placci
 5th Tre Valli Varesine
 8th Giro di Toscana

References

External links

 

1947 births
Living people
Swedish male cyclists
Olympic cyclists of Sweden
Olympic silver medalists for Sweden
Olympic medalists in cycling
Cyclists at the 1968 Summer Olympics
Sportspeople from Västra Götaland County
Medalists at the 1968 Summer Olympics
UCI Road World Champions (elite men)
Fåglum brothers